Branded is a 1950 American Technicolor Western film starring Alan Ladd, Mona Freeman, Charles Bickford, and Robert Keith. It was adapted from the novel Montana Rides by Max Brand under pen name Evan Evans. A gunfighter on the run from the law is talked into posing as the long-lost son of a wealthy rancher.

Plot
Choya (Alan Ladd), a gunfighter on the run, is tracked down by cowboys Leffingwell (Robert Keith) and "Tattoo" (John Berkes) in the mountains. They make him a part of a scheme to bilk a rich rancher named Lavery (Charles Bickford). The plan requires a tattoo on Choya's shoulder, but as soon as "Tattoo" creates one, Leffingwell shoots him in the back.

Choya rides to Lavery's Bar M ranch and asks foreman Ransome (Tom Tully) for a job, but does not get it. While they fight, Lavery and daughter Ruth (Mona Freeman) ride up. Lavery feels the ranch could use another good hand, so Choya is hired.

Ruth tells the new man how her 5-year-old brother was a kidnap victim many years ago, never seen again. One day, Lavery notices the tattoo and is amazed because his long-lost son had one just like it. Choya pretends it is a coincidence, but tells a story about a childhood memory that convinces Mr. and Mrs. Lavery that he is "Richard, Jr."

Leffingwell turns up and is hired at the ranch. His plot is to kill Lavery so that Choya can inherit the ranch. A guilt-ridden Choya offers him an alternative, stealing Lavery's stock on a cattle roundup.

Ruth rides along. Choya likes her so he double-crosses Leffingwell and has the cattle money deposited in the Laverys' account in an El Paso bank. He also learns that Leffingwell is the one who kidnapped the kid, only to have a Mexican bandit named Rubriz (Joseph Calleia) snatch the boy away. He confesses to Ruth and leaves the ranch.

Choya crosses the border and finds Lavery's son has been raised by Rubriz under the name Tonio. He persuades Tonio to return to his real home. Rubriz has raised the boy as his own son, and stung by his apparent betrayal, sends his men after them. Tonio is wounded by Rubriz’ men as he and Choya are riding off. Leffingwell also gives chase, but is killed in a stampede. Choya and Tonio are trapped just on the Texas side of the Rio Grande but are rescued just in time by Lavery and Ransome.

Rubriz comes to the ranch with his men to kill them, but is disarmed by Choya. Choya convinces him that Tonio did not betray him. Rubriz has a change of heart and tells Lavery that Tonio should stay with the Lavery family until he has recovered from his wound, and Lavery agrees Rubriz can visit anytime. Choya plans to ride off for good, but Ruth follows him and tells him that if he is leaving, she is going with him. She joins him on his horse, they kiss, and Choya heads his horse back toward the ranch house.

Cast
 Alan Ladd as Choya
 Mona Freeman as Ruth Lavery
 Charles Bickford as Mr. Richard Lavery
 Robert Keith as T. Jefferson Leffingwell
 Joseph Calleia as Rubriz
 Peter Hansen as Tonio
 Selena Royle as Mrs. Lavery
 Tom Tully as Ransom
 John Berkes as Tattoo
 Milburn Stone as Dawson
 Martin Garralaga as Hernandez
 Paul Featherstone as Cowhand #1

Production

Original novel
The film was based on the 1933 novel Montana Rides. It was written by Max Brand as Evan Evans. (The year before, RKO had released a Tom Keene Western called Montana Rides but the plot was different.)

The novel concerned a gunman, Montana, aka Arizona Kid, aka Mexico Kid, who impersonates the missing son of cattle magnate Richard Lavery. It turns out the real son is raised by a local outlaw, Meteo Rubriz. The New York Times called it "an exceptionally absorbing an exciting tale." The Los Angeles Times called it a "swinging, lilting Western... written with incredibly quiet savagery."

The novel was so popular it led to a sequel, Montana Rides Again. In this, the Montana Kid is lured into Mexico by bandit Mateo Rubriz and Friar Pacaul, who decide to steal an emerald from the governor which had been looted from a church.

Development
In 1948 Hedda Hopper announced that Winston Miller sold the story to Paramount, who would make it as a vehicle for Alan Ladd, with Miller to write the script and Robert Fellows to produce.

Leslie Fenton was originally set to direct. Fenton was then assigned to make The Jewell, so the film was handed to Rudolph Maté. Mel Epstein became the producer.

In March 1950 the film was retitled Branded.

Shooting
The movie was mostly shot on location in Arizona, in the border country near Douglas. Locations included Salt River Canyon, in the Dragoon Mountains, at the Slaughter Ranch and Cave Creek Canyon.

References

External links
 
 
 
 
 Review of film at The New York Times

1950 films
American historical films
Films about farmers
Films scored by Roy Webb
Films based on American novels
Films based on Western (genre) novels
Films set on farms
1950 Western (genre) films
1950s historical films
Paramount Pictures films
American Western (genre) films
1950s English-language films
Revisionist Western (genre) films
1950s American films